Khenchen Palden Sherab Rinpoche (10 May 1938 – 19 June 2010), also known as "Khen Rinpoche," was a teacher, a scholar, a lama, and a Dzogchen master in the Nyingma school of Tibetan Buddhism. He was considered by Penor Rinpoche to be one of the most learned living Nyingma scholars. Palden Sherab founded the Orgyen Samye Chokhor Ling Nunnery, the first nunnery in Deer Park (Sarnath).

Born in Kham, Tibet, Palden Sherab escaped invading Chinese forces in 1960 to arrive in India and join other monastic leaders to collect and salvage Tibetan Buddhist teachings carried by the exile community. He was appointed the Nyingma professor at the Central University of Tibetan Studies in 1967. Palden Sherab's root lamas are Dudjom Rinpoche, Penor Rinpoche, Dilgo Khyentse; his main lineages are Mipham Rinpoche's textual teachings and Terton Tsasum Lingpa's revealed Tersar. He considered Khenpo Ashe, his shedra teacher, very kind. 

A student of Dudjom Rinpoche, Palden Sherab taught in France and the United States. He founded the Padmasambava Buddhist Center in upstate New York, which grew to include monasteries and centers in Mexico, Canada, Puerto Rico, India and Russia. Palden Sherab designed and managed the construction of the retreat centers, monasteries and a nunnery, and the Miracle Stupa in India. His headquarters is at the Orgyen Samye Chokhor Ling Nunnery in Sarnath.

Life

Tibet 

Palden Sherab was born in the village of Joephu on 10 May 1938, in the year of the Earth Tiger. Joephu is in the Dhoshul region of Kham, Tibet, near the sacred mountain of Jowo Zegyal. His father was Lama Chimed Namgyal Rinpoche; his siblings included two sisters and a brother, and his grandparents were respected scholars and practitioners. In accordance with local tradition, his family were seasonal nomads; Pema Lhadze (Palden Sherab's mother) introduced him to the monk Lama Ahtsok, who was on a solitary retreat in a nearby cave.

Palden Sherab began monastic studies at age six at the Nyingma Gochen Monastery, which was founded in the late 17th century by the treasure revealer and crazy wisdom terton Tsasum Lingpa. Tsasum Lingpa was a recognized reincarnation of Nubchen Sangye Yeshe, one of Padmasambhava's twenty-five students. Palden Sherab is a recognized emanation of Nubchen Sangye Yeshe. He was known for reading very fast at Gochen Monastery, and was considered eccentric. Palden Sherab's nickname was "the cyclone", due to his constant activity.

The monastery had been administered for generations by Palden Sherab's family. He was invited to attend Riwoche Monastery's shedra at age 12, where he could be trained to take over as khenpo (abbot) of Gochen Monastery. Palden Sherab then entered the Taklung Kagyu school's Riwoche Monastery, in the Riwoche region of Kham. He received the teachings of Mipham Rinpoche and the Katok Monastery through Khenpo Ashe, his shedra teacher, in addition to Longchenpa's Seven Treasuries, three volumes of Rongzompa and the teachings of Katokpa Dampa Deshek, Katok Khempo Nyakchung, and Getse Mahapandita. Just before China's invasion of eastern Tibet, Palden Sherab completed the shedra's monastic education at Riwoche Monastery; this included philosophy, astrology, medicine, Sanskrit and the major Buddhist texts.

During the winter of 1960, after the Chinese invasion, he left the monastery to join his family as they escaped into the Himalayas. With India as their destination, they escaped capture three times; one was at Pemako (present-day Nyingchi). Palden Sherab's youngest sister, Ting Ting Karmo, died. Another sister, Yangzom, and his mother died after arriving at a refugee camp in Assam. His father and his brother, Khenpo Tsewang Dongyal Rinpoche, survived.

India
After their escape to India, Palden Sherab and his family arrived at a refugee camp in Kalimpong and lived with other Tibetans fleeing the Chinese forces; he taught the Prajnaparamita, from Mipham Rinpoche, and grammar in the Sumtak daily. The family then moved to a camp in Darjeeling for six months, where Palden Sherab continued teaching from Mipham's commentaries, Shantideva's Bodhisattvacaryāvatāra (The Way of the Bodhisattva), and the Sumtak to the exile community. 

In Mussoorie in 1965, Dudjom Rinpoche asked him to be the Nyingma representative at a year-long scholarly conference of the four main schools of Tibetan Buddhism convened by the 14th Dalai Lama. Khunu Tenzin Gyaltsen Rinpoche was the main speaker at the conference, which was dedicated to protecting Tibet's culture and spiritual heritage. The conference also focused on recovering sacred texts which were missing or were destroyed by China during its invasion. Palden Sherab was responsible for salvaging thousands of texts and commentaries, and the complete Tibetan cycle of Mahayana and Vajrayana Buddhist teachings was recovered. 

The Central Institute of Higher Tibetan Studies (later renamed the Central University for Tibetan Studies), which resulted from the conference, opened in Varanasi in 1967. Palden Sherab was appointed by Dudjom Rinpoche to found the institute and represent the Nyingma school, and received the Nyingma Kama, the Nyingma Terma and the Guhyagarbha tantra from Dudjom Rinpoche. 

For a time, he was the only professor and administrator in the Nyingma department. Palden Sherab taught there for 17 years, up to 13 classes a day during the early years. Dilgo Khyentse Rinpoche and other Nyingma teachers were pleased with his work, and gave him more teaching opportunities. Dilgo Khyentse became his root lama, and Palden Sherab also taught in the Tibetan department of Varanasi's Government Sanskrit College.

The West 

Palden Sherab first traveled to the United States in 1980 with his brother, Khenpo Tsewang Dongyal Rinpoche, at the behest of Rhoda P. Lecocq of California. In Vermont, connections were established between Dudjom Rinpoche, Palden Sherab and his brother and Venerable Khandro Dhyani Ywahoo of the Cherokee Nation at the Sunray Meditation Society. The connection fulfills Padmasambhava's prophecy of "when the iron bird flies" and a Hopi prophecy of white brothers wearing a "red cap or red cloak".

In 1981, Palden Sherab replaced his brother as khenpo of Dudjom Rinpoche's Dorje Nyingpo center in Paris due to Khenpo Tsewang's problems with travel documents. He co-founded Dharma Samudra, a non-profit publishing company in Boulder, Colorado, with his brother four years later. Palden Sherab has written and published a number of works on Tibetan history, biographies of Vajrayana masters, on Tibetan language and grammar, poetry and logic. 

In 1989, he and his brother founded the Padmasambhava Buddhist Center. Its main retreat center and monastery is Palden Pema Samye Ling, located in Sidney Center, Delaware County, New York. The center has grown to 19 retreat locations and monastic institutions in the US, Puerto Rico, Russia and India. 

Palden Sherab directed design and building projects at monasteries, a nunnery, and retreat centers. Land in Sarnath was purchased in 1972, and construction began in 1990 for Padma Samye Chokhor Ling Monastery. The monastery was consecrated in 1995. Palden Sherab met Jigme Phuntsok during the lama's 1990s travels to the West. 

The first Buddhist nunnery since the Buddha's teachings at Sarnath, Orgyen Samye Chokhor Ling Nunnery was opened by Palden Sherab in March 2003 and was consecrated on 12 November 2006 by the Maha Bodhi Society and other Buddhist institutions. In 2004 at Jetavan Grove in Shravasti, where the Buddha spent the rainy seasons in retreat and performed miracles, he created the Miracle Stupa for World Peace. Palden Sherab died on 19 June 2010 at Palden Pema Samye Ling.

Teachers 
Palden Sherab's teachers from Tibet, India and the U.S. include:
 Dudjom Jigdral Yeshe Dorje 
 Kyabje Penor Rinpoche 
 Dilgo Khyentse Tashi Paljor 
 14th Dalai Lama 
 Khenchen Jigme Phuntsok
 Dzigar Kongtrul Lodro Rabphel
 Chatral Rinpoche

Lineages 
Palden Sherab's lineages include:
 Mipham Rinpoche (primary textual lineage, including the Kalachakra Tantra, Chetsun Nyingtik, and the Katok Monastery Mipham teachings)
 Tsasum Lingpa (primary terma lineage)
 Nyingma kama (oral) lineage and "treasures" terma lineage

Works

English-language commentaries 
Prajnaparamita: The Six Perfections. Sky Dancer Press, 1990. 
The Commentary on Mipham's Sherab Raltri: The Blazing Lights of the Sun and Moon, Turtle Hill Sangha (transcription of translation)
The Commentary on Mipham's Sherab Raltri Entitled: The Blazing Lights of the Sun and Moon. Dharma Samudra, 1997.
The Smile of Sun and Moon: A Commentary on the Praise to the Twenty-One Taras, translated by Anna Orlova. Sky Dancer Press, 2004. 
With Khenpo Tsewang Dongyal. Door to Inconceivable Wisdom and Compassion. Sky Dancer, 1996.
With Khenpo Tsewang Dongyal. Lion's Gaze: A Commentary on Tsig Sum Nedek. Sky Dancer Press, 1998. 
With Khenpo Tsewang Dongyal. Ceaseless Echoes of Great Silence. Sky Dancer Press, 1999. 
With Khenpo Tsewang Dongyal. Opening To Our Primordial Nature. Snow Lion Publications, 2006. 
With Khenpo Tsewang Dongyal. Tara's Enlightened Activity: An Oral Commentary on The Twenty-one Praises to Tara. Snow Lion Publications, 2007. 
With Khenpo Tsewang Dongyal. Illuminating the Path: Ngondro Instructions According to the Nyingma School of Vajrayana Buddhism. Padmasambhava Buddhist Center, 2008.
With Khenpo Tsewang Dongyal. The Dark Red Amulet: Oral Instructions of the Practice of Vajrakilaya. Snow Lion Publications, 2008. 
With Khenpo Tsewang Dongyal. Beauty of Awakened Mind: Dzogchen Lineage of Shigpo Dudtsi. Dharma Samudra, 2013.

Padma Samye Ling shedra texts 
With Khenpo Tsewang Dongyal. Opening the Clear Vision of the Vaibhashika and Sautrantika Schools. PSL Shedra Series, Volume 1, Dharma Samudra, 2007.
With Khenpo Tsewang Dongyal. Opening the Clear Vision of the Mind Only School. PSL Shedra Series, Volume 2, Dharma Samudra, 2007.
With Khenpo Tsewang Dongyal. Opening the Wisdom Door of the Madhyamaka School. PSL Shedra Series, Volume 3, Dharma Samudra, 2008.
With Khenpo Tsewang Dongyal. Opening the Wisdom Door of the Rangtong and Shentong Views: A Brief Explanation of the One Taste of the Second and Third Turnings of the Wheel of Dharma. PSL Shedra Series, Volume 4, Dharma Samudra, 2009.
With Khenpo Tsewang Dongyal. Opening the Wisdom Door of the Outer Tantras: Refining Awareness Through Ascetic Ritual and Purification Practice. PSL Shedra Series, Volume 5, Dharma Samudra, 2009.
With Khenpo Tsewang Dongyal. Splendid Presence of the Great Guhyagarbha: Opening the Wisdom Door of the King of All Tantras. PSL Shedra Series, Volume 6, Dharma Samudra, 2011.
With Khenpo Tsewang Dongyal. Key to Opening the Wisdom Door of Anuyoga. PSL Shedra Series, Volume 7, Dharma Samudra, 2015.
Turning the Wisdom Wheel of the Nine Golden Chariots. PSL Shedra Series, Volume 8, Dharma Samudra, 2011 (from a 1987 lecture in Australia).

Tibetan-language commentaries 
Palden Sherab's Tibetan-language commentaries have been collected in three ebook volumes entitled Collected Works of Khenchen Palden Sherab Rinpoche.

Spanish-language commentaries 
With Khenpo Tsewang Dongyal. La Luz del Dharma. Dharma Samudra, 2011.
Echos Incesantes del Gran Silencio: Un Comentario sobre la Prajñāpāramitā del Sūtra del Corazón. Dharma Samudra, 2019.

Notes

References

Citations

Works cited
Primary sources
 
 
 

Secondary sources

Further reading
 

Biographical
 
 

  

Tibetan texts

External links 
 
 sgo chen mkhan po dpal ldan shes rab at The Buddhist Digital Archives

1938 births
2010 deaths
20th-century lamas
21st-century lamas
Buddhist monks from Tibet
Contemporary Tibetan philosophers
Dzogchen lamas
Lamas from Tibet
Nyingma lamas
Rinpoches
Scholars of Buddhism from Tibet
Taklung Kagyu lamas
Tibetan Buddhism writers